is a Japanese actor, voice actor, narrator and singer. His notable works include Kakashi Hatake in Naruto, Kars in JoJo's Bizarre Adventure, Toichirou Suzuki in Mob Psycho 100 and Gildarts Clive in Fairy Tail and lastly Tsugikuni Yoriichi in Demon Slayer.

Biography
Since his debut in 1973, he became one of Japan's most well established voice actors. His early roles from the 1970s include Anthony in Candy Candy, and later as Joe in the 1979 remake of Cyborg 009. In the 1980s, Inoue's work ranged from the adult-oriented Oishinbo (The Gourmet) to the popular Legend of Heavenly Sphere Shurato for the younger generation. More recently, he is known internationally for roles such as Kars in JoJo's Bizarre Adventure, Kakashi Hatake in Naruto, Eiri Yuki in Gravitation, Aion in Chrono Crusade, Hatori Sohma in Fruits Basket, and Nyanko-sensei/Madara in Natsume Yūjin Chō. His voice performance is often described as natural and relaxed.

This wide and versatile vocal range allows Inoue to voice roles of varying personality types: hot-blooded, righteous main characters such as Joe in Cyborg 009 and Akira Kogane in Golion; coolly arrogant bishōnen typified by Eiri Yuki; the amusingly fussy yet powerful mazoku (demon), Guenter in Kyo Kara Maoh!; seductive, manipulative villains like Aion; and bloodthirsty killers (e.g. Kars and Gotou). Inoue is also well known for more unusual roles such as the crossdresser Nagisa Sawa in Haru wo Daiteita, and Shiron the Windragon in Legendz, who spends half his time as a screeching hamster.

Inoue does voices for anime, video games, drama CDs, Japanese-dubbed movies, and audio books. He has put out many LP and CD albums and has sung in various anime character albums.  His most well-known songs are the ones related to the Harukanaru Toki no Naka de Hachiyō Shō series, which he performs live on stage at the annual NeoRomance voice acting events in Japan. In recent years, Inoue has also tried his hand in backstage work such as sound directing. He has set up his own voice acting agency and school, B-Box, to teach the next generation voice talents. He is also the official dubbing roles for Matthew Fox and Mads Mikkelsen.

Being a second-generation A-bomb survivor, he feels strongly against wars. In his autobiographical piece, "Ai ni Tsuite", (愛について About Love, from his CD album Ai, 2003) Inoue expresses his longings for world peace and his love and respect for the ocean and Mother Earth. He was also a close friend of the late fellow voice actor Daisuke Gori. Recently, Inoue won as "Best Supporting Actor" in the Third Seiyu Awards for his role as Nyanko-sensei in Natsume Yūjin Chō.

Personal life
Inoue has married and divorced three times. His first marriage was with manga artist Yumiko Igarashi. Together, they have a son named Keiichi Igarashi (born 1980 or 1981), known professionally as Nanami Igarashi, who is a former idol trainee at Johnny & Associates and later published a comic essay about his experiences as an otokonoko. His second marriage was with actress . His third marriage was with actress , whom he married in 2001 and later divorced in 2012.

Filmography

Anime

Films

Video games

Tokusatsu

Motion Comic
Ultraman (manga) (2015) - Alien Sukurada Adad

Overseas dubbing

Live-action

Animation

Other roles
 From Far Away (彼方から) CD Drama (1999): Keimos Lee Goda

Discography

Albums

Singles

Drama audio recordings

References

External links 
 Official blog 
 Official agency profile 
 

1954 births
Living people
Japanese male stage actors
Japanese male video game actors
Japanese male voice actors
Male voice actors from Yokohama
Seiyu Award winners
Japanese voice directors
20th-century Japanese male actors
21st-century Japanese male actors